The following notable people were born in or are associated with Eau Claire, Wisconsin.

Artists and performers 

George Awsumb, Norwegian-American architect
Stanley Blystone, actor
Curt Boettcher, musician, producer, songwriter
Sean Carey, musician with Bon Iver
Alden Carter, ALA award-winning author
Lars Hanson, drummer for United Artists recording group Bad Boy
Cornelia Ellis Hildebrandt, portrait artist
Mike Kappus, music manager and record producer, inductee in the Blues Hall of Fame
Geoffrey Keezer, jazz pianist—the last to play with Art Blakey's Jazz Messengers
Cayla Kluver, author
Mark Kosower, cellist
John Myhers, actor
Ryan Olson, drummer and producer
Arthur Peabody, state architect of Wisconsin
Justin Vernon, Grammy award-winning frontman of Bon Iver

Athletes 

 Lemoine Batson, Olympic ski jumper
 Dick Bennett, former Wisconsin and Washington State basketball coach; coached Eau Claire Memorial High School basketball
 Cub Buck, NFL player and head coach of the Miami Hurricanes football team
 Jake Dowell, NHL player
 Cliff Fagan, member of the Naismith Memorial Basketball Hall of Fame
 Marv Harshman, former college men's basketball coach for Washington, Washington State, and Pacific Lutheran
 Alex Hicks, NHL player and only University of Wisconsin–Eau Claire Alumnus to play in NHL regular season and playoff games.
 Mike Hintz, NFL player
 Herm Johnson, former CART / Indy 500 race car driver
 Vic Johnson, MLB player
 Steve Lingenfelter, NBA player
 Adam Loomis, Nordic combined skier
 Jake McCabe, NHL Player
 Patrick McLain, MLS player
 Paul Menard, NASCAR driver
 Chuck Mencel, NBA player
 Pat O'Donahue, NFL player
 Willis S. Olson, Olympic ski jumper, member of the U.S. Ski and Snowboard Hall of Fame
 Sis Paulsen, ice hockey and softball coach
 Mike Peplinski, Olympic curler
 Ralph Pond, baseball player
 Tom Poquette, MLB player for Kansas City Royals (1973, 1976–79, 1982), Boston Red Sox and Texas Rangers
 Brad Radke, MLB pitcher for the Minnesota Twins, born in Eau Claire
 Bill Schroeder, NFL wide receiver
 Roderick Strong, WWE Wrestler
 John Stiegelmeier, head coach of the South Dakota State Jackrabbits football team
 Jerry Wunsch, NFL player
 Reed Zuehlke, Olympic ski jumper

Journalists and activists 

Waldemar Ager, Norwegian-American newspaperman and author
Ellen Gabler, New York Times investigative journalist
Eppie Lederer, advice columnist who wrote under the pseudonym Ann Landers (during her time in Eau Claire she served as chair of the Eau Claire Democratic Party.)
Julie Nelson, TV news anchor affiliated with KARE-TV in Minnesota
Marcus Thrane, Norwegian labor organizer who died in Eau Claire in 1890
Abigail van Buren, advice columnist known for "Dear Abby"

Politicians 

Thomas H. Barland, judge and state representative
Byron Buffington, state representative
Jonathan G. Callahan, state representative
Thomas Carmichael, state representative
Henry Cousins, state representative
Marshall Cousins, state representative
Charles H. Daub, state representative
John R. Davis Jr., American diplomat
Dave Duax, Wisconsin Cabinet Secretary, Vice President of the Eau Claire City Council, Chairman of the Eau Claire County Board
Julius C. Gilbertson, state representative
Charles R. Gleason, businessman and state representative
Karl J. Goethel, lawyer and state representative
Hiram P. Graham, state representative
Michael Griffin, U.S. representative
Steve Gunderson, CEO of the Council on Foundations and U.S representative
Joseph E. Irish, state senator
Raymond C. Johnson, State Senate Majority Leader
Ray Kuhlman, state representative
Jacquelyn J. Lahn, state representative
Herman Lange, state senator
Henry Laycock, state representative
Joseph Looby, state representative
Frank McDonough, state representative and senator
James D. Millar, state representative
James H. Noble, physician and state representative
Bradley Phillips, state representative
William T. Pugh, state representative
Bernard H. Raether, state representative
George B. Shaw, U.S. representative
Peter J. Smith, state senator
Hobart Stocking, state representative
Joseph G. Thorp, state senator
Dana Wachs, lawyer and state representative

Other 

Mary Brunner, former girlfriend of Charles Manson
George Buffington, businessman
Moncena Dunn, inventor
Nancy B. Jackson, chemist
Scott D. Legwold, U.S. National Guard general
Hugh J. McGrath, Medal of Honor recipient
John Menard Jr., founder of Menards
John Joseph Paul, Roman Catholic Bishop, helped establish Regis High School in Eau Claire
Henry Cleveland Putnam, lumber baron and philanthropist who gave Putnam Park to the city of Eau Claire

See also 
List of University of Wisconsin–Eau Claire people

References

Eau Claire
Eau Claire
Eau Claire, Wisconsin